Marion Limal (born 1987) is a French handball player. She plays for the French club Brest Bretagne Handball and for the French national team.

She participated at the 2009 World Women's Handball Championship in China, winning a silver medal with the French team.

References

External links

1987 births
Living people
French female handball players
Mediterranean Games medalists in handball
Mediterranean Games gold medalists for France
Competitors at the 2009 Mediterranean Games